Vtoraya Pyatiletka or 2-ya Pyatiletka may refer to:

Second five-year plan (Soviet Union) (1933–1937) for the national economy of the Soviet Union
Vtoraya Pyatiletka, Kazakhstan, a village in the Almaty Province, Kazakhstan
Vtoraya Pyatiletka, Russia, name of several rural localities in Russia